The 2018 Chinese Football Association Member Association Champions League, former known as  Chinese Football Association Bing League (before 2006) and Chinese Football Association Amateur League (2006–2017), is the fourth-tier football league of the People's Republic of China. The league is under the auspices of the Chinese Football Association.

Promotion and relegation

From Champions League 
Teams promoted to 2018 China League Two 
 Zibo Sunday
 Anhui Hefei Guiguan
 Yanbian Beiguo
 Fujian Tianxin 
 Shenzhen Pengcheng
 Sichuan Jiuniu

Format
The qualification structure is as follows:
First round (qualifying round): Chinese Football Association subordinate Provincial League and City League, champion will advance to the second round.
Second round (regional finals): It is divided into eight groups. The top two teams of each group will advance to Third round.
Third round (national finals): The third round is a two-legged elimination. The six winners may be qualify for the 2019 China League Two.

First round
China Amateur Football League includes 44 regional leagues. 2017 or 2018 season champion will advance to the second round.

Teams qualified for the second round

5th–8th-place semifinals

7th–8th place

5th–6th place

Semi-finals

|}

Third-Place Match

Final match

|}

Awards
The awards of 2018 Chinese Champions League were announced on 8 December 2018.

References

2018 in Chinese football leagues